Sandrine François (born December 1980 in Paris) is a French singer who represented France at the 2002 Eurovision Song Contest.

Biography
She was discovered singing in a pub and invited to sing on the television show of Mireille Dumas. This appearance led to a record contract, and to her working with producer-writer-arranger Erick Benzi (Jean-Jacques Goldman, Céline Dion).

In 2002 François was invited by French television to represent her country in the Eurovision Song Contest. Rick Allison, Marie-Florence Gros and Patrick Bruel wrote a song for her called "Il faut du temps." She reached fifth position with 104 points.

Her success led to the production of a solo album entitled 'Et Si Le Monde...', boasting 14 tracks in French including 'Il Faut Du Temps' along with a variety of mid tempo tracks and power ballads, which portray Francois's vocal ability.

References

1980 births
Living people
Eurovision Song Contest entrants for France
Eurovision Song Contest entrants of 2002
21st-century French singers
21st-century French women singers